HomeVestors of America, Inc. is a privately owned, nationwide US real estate investing franchisor. It's independently owned and operated franchisees buy homes in need of repair and homes that owners need to sell more quickly than usually can be done through a realtor. Franchisees usually renovate and sell or rent the homes. The company was formed in 1996 to give people a fast and easy way to sell a house or unwanted property for cash. Since then, they have bought over 125,000 homes for cash and have become America’s #1 cash home buyer. 

The firm is headquartered in Dallas, Texas. Currently David Hicks is CEO and President of HomeVestors.

History
Real estate agent Ken D'Angelo founded HomeVestors of America in 1989 and began franchising in 1996. By the end of that year, it had 17 franchisees and generated about $800,000 in revenue. It also sold its 25,000th house, in Jonesboro, GA. Franchisees hold the homes for six months on average.

1997

In 1997, HomeVestors reached 30 franchises with $1.7 million in revenue.

2003

By 2003, HomeVestors had grown to 135 offices in 17 states. In February 2004, the company signed an agreement with The Home Depot, making the hardware company its official provider of building materials.

2004

In July 2004, the company launched a real estate-owned (REO) program. HomeVestors purchased single-family houses from its franchisees and called them "ugly notes". They were then sold to third party note purchasers. By the end of 2004 the firm had moved to a larger headquarters. A new mascot was launched, “UG” the Caveman. The company added an additional advertising slogan, "UG Buys Ugly Houses," and both mascot and slogan appeared on new billboards and TV commercials.

In 2004, Ken D'Angelo was diagnosed with terminal cancer, and in September 2004 national franchise consultant John Hayes took over as president and CEO. D'Angelo died on January 8, 2005.

2007-2009

After the slowdown in housing sales due to the United States sub-prime mortgage crisis, the firm marketed its services to financially distressed home owners who were facing foreclosures and looking for a quick sale. Holding company Franchise Brands LLC acquired majority interest of the firm on June 11, 2008.

2017

On February 7, 2018, HomeVestors purchased its 85,000th house since its incorporation in 1996. .

HomeVestors passed hands again on April 27, 2017, when it was purchased by the Los Angeles-based private equity firm Levine Leichtman Capital Partners and Management.

Proprietary Tools

The company provides franchisees with a proprietary software system, ValueChek, to evaluate single-family homes for repair costs and after-repair market value of a property.

The firm, in conjunction with Local Market Monitor, maintained a set of "Best Markets to Invest in Rental Property" rankings, to forecast expected performance of rental properties, particularly single-family homes.

Awards

On October 15, 2018, Franchising Times again named HomeVestors the "third fastest-growing franchise in America."

References

External links
Official Company Website for buying houses
Official Company Website for franchising

Real estate companies established in 1989
Franchises
Real estate services companies of the United States
Companies based in Dallas
American companies established in 1989